Pavel Stepanovich Prokkonen (16 July 1909 – 18 July 1979), born Prokofiev, was a Karelian Soviet politician. He was appointed as the Chairman of the Council of the People's Commissars of the Karelo-Finnish Soviet Socialist Republic (1940–1947) and Chairman of the Council of Ministers of the Karelo-Finnish Soviet Socialist Republic (1950–1956) ("prime minister" of the Republic). Prokkonen was also the Minister of Karelian Affairs for the Finnish Democratic Republic during the Winter War in 1940 (under the name Paavo Prokkonen)

After the Karelo-Finnish SSR was incorporated into the Russian SFSR as the Karelian Autonomous Soviet Socialist Republic in 1956, Prokkonen was the Chairman of the Presidium of the Supreme Soviet of the Karelian Autonomous Soviet Socialist Republic (1956–1979).

Pavel Prokkonen was awarded the Order of Lenin twice, the Order of the Patriotic War second class once, the Order of the Red Banner of Labour twice, and the Order of the Badge of Honor twice.

Written works 
Geroizm naroda v dni voiny: Vospominaniia, (1974) D811.5 .P73 1974

References

External links 
Pavel Stepanovich Prokkonen at Republic of Karelia website 

1909 births
1979 deaths
People from Suoyarvsky District
People from Povenetsky Uyezd
Russian Karelian people
Communist Party of the Soviet Union members
Government ministers of the Finnish Democratic Republic
Heads of government of the Karelo-Finnish Soviet Socialist Republic
Members of the Supreme Soviet of the Karelo-Finnish Soviet Socialist Republic
First convocation members of the Soviet of Nationalities
Second convocation members of the Soviet of Nationalities
Third convocation members of the Soviet of Nationalities
Fourth convocation members of the Soviet of Nationalities
Fifth convocation members of the Soviet of Nationalities
Sixth convocation members of the Soviet of Nationalities
Recipients of the Order of Lenin
Recipients of the Order of the Red Banner of Labour
Recipients of the Order of Friendship of Peoples